Paradigm in Entropy is the debut album by the California based metal music group Bleed the Sky. The album was released on April 19, 2005 through Nuclear Blast Records.

Track listing
 "Minion" – 4:11
 "Killtank" – 3:37
 "Paradigm in Entropy" – 3:34
 "Skin Un Skin" – 4:08
 "Leverage" – 3:56
 "The Martyr" – 5:50
 "Gated" – 3:02
 "God in the Frame" – 3:57
 "Division" (feat. T.J. Frost & Joe Cafarella of STEMM) – 3:26
 "Borrelia Mass" – 5:09

Personnel
Noah Robinson - vocals
Kyle Moorman - guitar
Wayne Miller - guitar
Casey Kulek - bass
Austin D’Amond - drums
Luke Anderson - samples, electronics

References

2005 debut albums
Nuclear Blast albums
Bleed the Sky (band) albums